Fiumedinisi (Sicilian: Ciumidinisi) is a comune (municipality) in the Metropolitan City of Messina in the Italian region Sicily, located about  east of Palermo and about  southwest of Messina.

Fiumedinisi borders the following municipalities: Alì, Alì Terme, Itala, Mandanici, Messina, Monforte San Giorgio, Nizza di Sicilia, Roccalumera, San Pier Niceto, Santa Lucia del Mela.

Fiumedinisi is known for the celebration of The Annunciation of Mary, called the Festa Della Vara(Feast of the Float).

People
 Cateno De Luca (born 1972)
 Clementina Cicala (born 1946)

References

External links
Official website

Cities and towns in Sicily